Józef Lewartowski (birth name: Aron Finkelstein  May 1895 Bielsk Podlaski - 25 August 1942 Warsaw) was a Polish communist politician of Jewish origin, revolutionary, member of the KPP and PPR one of the first organizers of the Jewish resistance in Nazi occupied Poland, co-founder of the Anti-Fascist Bloc.

Biography

Józef Lewartowski was born in 1895 into a family of poor Torah-observant Jews. His parents were Moishe and Chava Lewartowski. He joined the Poale Zion in 1918. In 1920 Lewartowski was member of the Provisional Polish Revolutionary Committee. He was co-founder of Communist Party of Poland and member of the Central Jewish Bureau. On 9 April 1926 he was arrested and sentenced by the Polish court to 3 years in prison. Lewartowski was member and leader of Prison's Commune - organization of left-wing political prisoners in Second Polish Republic. He escaped from prison in December 1926 and fled to Moscow. In 1932 Lewartowski returned to Poland. In 1933 he was one of the organizers of labor strike in Łódź and Białystok. In 1934 he was re-arrested and sentenced to 12 years of prison. In prison he met Alfred Lampe, Paweł Finder and Bolesław Bierut. Lewartowski was released from the prison on 1 September 1939 and took part in Defense of Warsaw during the September Campaign. Since 1941 he lived in Warsaw Ghetto. Józef Lewartowski died 25 August 1942, shot by Gestapo. He has been awarded the Order of the Cross of Grunwald.

See also
 Polish resistance movement in World War II
 Jewish resistance under Nazi rule

References

1895 births
1942 deaths
Communist Party of Poland politicians
Jewish Polish politicians
Jewish resistance members during the Holocaust
Jewish socialists
Warsaw Ghetto inmates
People who died in the Warsaw Ghetto
Polish resistance members of World War II
Polish revolutionaries
Polish Workers' Party politicians
Recipients of the Order of the Cross of Grunwald, 3rd class